Infatuation is  the state of being completely carried away by unreasoned passion or love.

Infatuation may also refer to:

Film 
Infatuation (1915 film), an American lost silent film
Infatuation (1918 film), a French silent film
Infatuation (1925 film), an American silent film
Infatuation, a 1995 Hong Kong film featuring Money Lo

Music 
Infatuation (album) or the title song, by Kate Alexa, 2012
"Infatuation" (Rod Stewart song), 1984
"Infatuation", a song by Christina Aguilera from Stripped, 2002
"Infatuation", a song by Flobots from Survival Story, 2010
"Infatuation", a song by Jamie Foxx from Peep This, 1994
"Infatuation", a song by John Farnham from Uncovered, 1980
"Infatuation", a song by Jonas Brothers from the Japanese release of A Little Bit Longer, 2008
"Infatuation", a song by Maroon 5 from It Won't Be Soon Before Long, 2007
"Infatuation", a song by the Rapture from Echoes, 2003
"Infatuation", a song by Sophie from Oil of Every Pearl's Un-Insides, 2018
"Infatuation", a song by Takeoff from The Last Rocket, 2018
"Infatuation", a song by Up Front

Other uses
The Infatuation, an American restaurant recommendation website
The Infatuations, a 2011 novel by Javier Marías